This is a list of important buiildings in Bogotá, the capital of Colombia.

List

Colonial buildings

Post-Colonial buildings

References

 
Lists of oldest buildings and structures in Colombia
Lists of churches
History of Bogotá
 
Historic preservation
Architecture lists